Pedro Joaquín may refer to:

Pedro Joaquín Chamorro Alfaro, President of Nicaragua, 1875–1879
Pedro Joaquín Chamorro Cardenal, martyred Somoza opponent and grandson of the president.
Pedro Joaquín Coldwell, Mexican politician and former Governor of Quintana Roo